Unexpected Records is a Dutch record label founded by composer/producer Perquisite, who was part of the hiphop duo Pete Philly & Perquisite.

History
The label was founded in 2001 in Amsterdam, with the main goal of focusing on Hip hop, Nu jazz and Groove based music. Their best selling albums so far have been 'Mindstate' and 'Mystery Repeats' by Pete Philly & Perquisite, 'Lovestruck Puzzles' by Kris Berry & Perquisite and 'High On You' by Jeangu Macrooy. Unexpected Records has collaborated with various labels and distributors worldwide, including PIAS and Epitaph Records in Europe, P-Vine Records in Japan, ANTI- in the US and Music Aroma in Korea.

Artists
The label has released albums with or collaborated with the following artists:

References

External links
 
 :nl:Categorie:Nederlands platenlabel
http://platenmaatschappijen.besteoverzicht.nl/Nederlandse-labels-algemeen.html
http://www.petephillyandperquisite.com

Dutch record labels